The Swiss City Marathon is a marathon in Lucerne, first held in 2007.  A half marathon and a "try-out marathon" (Schnuppermarathon) of 13 km are also part of the programme.

History 

The marathon was held for the first time on 28 October 2007.

The 2020 in-person edition of the race was cancelled due to the coronavirus pandemic, with all registrants given the option of registering for free for 2021, obtaining a voucher for the marathon valid until 2023 (minus a 10 CHF handling fee), or obtaining a refund (minus a 20 CHF handling fee).

Course 

The course is a circuit with the length of a half marathon, which starts and finishes at the Swiss Transport Museum. The track runs first along the "Haldenstrasse", passing by the chapel royal and the traditional luxury hotels of the city. Departing from "Schwanenplatz", the runners cross the pier from where they can see the famous chapel bridge and the water tower as well as the Old Town. On the other side of the lake, the track passes by the Lucerne Culture and Congress Centre built by Jean Nouvel, around the Horwer peninsula and along Lake Lucerne with a view of the impressive Alpine panorama of Central Switzerland. From Horw, where the finish line of the "try-out marathon" (Schnuppermarathon) is located; the course leads through the Allmend stadium back to the pier and to the Swiss Transport Museum.

Management 
It is organised by the Lucerne Marathon Association.

Viktor Röthlin, currently best Swiss marathon runner, has become the ambassador of the race.

Winners 

Key: Course record

Statistic

28 October 2007 

Fastest Runner Half Marathon
 Men: Daniel Renggli, Luzern,  1:11.30,3
 Women: Renata Bucher, Littau, 1:21.16,2

 Finisher
 Marathon: 2713 (2136 men und 577 women)
 Half Marathon: 2263 (1403 men und 860 women)
 Try-out Marathon: 419 (190 men und 229 women)

26 October 2008 

 Fastest Runner Halbmarathon
 Men: Ueli Koch, Schwendibach, 1:07.48,7
 Women: Addis Gezahegne, Kriens, 1:18.54,6

 Finisher 
 Marathon:2303 (1837 men und 466 women)
 Half Marathon:3947 (2562 men und 1385 women)
 Try-out Marathon:385 (161 men und 224 women)

See also 

 List of marathon races in Europe

Notes

References

External links 
 Official web page
 Lucerne Marathon 2007 on laufreport.de
 Lucerne Marathon 2007 on sportheute.ch
 3D Flying over the course on Google Earth

Marathons in Switzerland
Recurring sporting events established in 2007
Athletics competitions in Switzerland
Sport in Lucerne
Autumn events in Switzerland